Alejandro Ángel Guzmán Brito (21 March 1945 – 13 August 2021) was a Chilean lawyer and historian.

Biography
He was an emeritus Roman Law professor at the Law Faculty of the Pontifical Catholic University of Valparaíso and served as rector of the Metropolitan University of Educational Sciences from 1989 to 1990. Brito died of COVID-19 in 2021.

In 2017, he presented the book Las Instituciones de Gayo, which was wrote by Francisco Samper Polo.

Works
 Guzmán Brito, Alejandro (1974). Caución tutelar en derecho romano. Pamplona: Universidad de Navarra. 329 pages
 Guzmán Brito, Alejandro (1976). Dos estudios en torno a la historia de la tutela romana. Pamplona: Universidad de Navarra. 300 pages
 Guzmán Brito, Alejandro (1996). Derecho privado romano; Tomo I. Santiago de Chile: Editorial Jurídica de Chile. 802 pages
 Guzmán Brito, Alejandro (1996). Derecho privado romano; Tomo II. Santiago de Chile: Editorial Jurídica de Chile. 790 pages

References

External links
 PUCV Profile
 Alvaro d'Ors (1915–2004)

1945 births
2021 deaths
People from Santiago
20th-century Chilean lawyers
Chilean historians
Scholars of Roman law
Pontifical Catholic University of Valparaíso alumni
University of Navarra alumni
Academic staff of the Pontifical Catholic University of Valparaíso
Deaths from the COVID-19 pandemic in Chile